Richard Sheldon (July 9, 1878 in Rutland, Vermont – January 23, 1935 in New York, New York) was the winner of the gold medal in the men's shot put at the 1900 Summer Olympics held in Paris, France. Sheldon, an American, won with a throw of 14.10 m. He also won a bronze medal in the discus throw. Sheldon's brother Lewis competed at the same Olympics, winning two bronze medals in jumping events.

References

External links

American male shot putters
American male discus throwers
Athletes (track and field) at the 1900 Summer Olympics
1878 births
1935 deaths
Medalists at the 1900 Summer Olympics
Olympic gold medalists for the United States in track and field
Olympic bronze medalists for the United States in track and field
People from Rutland (city), Vermont
Track and field athletes from Vermont
Yale Bulldogs football players
Players of American football from Vermont